J O'Donnell (Sydney) was a professional rugby league footballer in Australia's leading competition - the New South Wales Rugby League (NSWRL).

O'Donnell, a forward,  played for the Eastern Suburbs club in the 1923 season and is recognised as that club's 142nd player.

References

 

Australian rugby league players
Sydney Roosters players
Year of birth missing
Year of death missing
Rugby league players from Sydney